The Cologne Public Library is among the biggest and most important public libraries in Germany. The central library is part of the 'Kulturquartier' (a cultural hub) near the Neumarkt. It is located at the Josef-Haubrich-Hof, with the new Rautenstrauch-Joest-Museum (cultures of the world) in its immediate neighbourhood. Since 2008, Dr. Hannelore Vogt has been the director of the library.

The library system
The library system is made up of the central library, 11 branch libraries, a mobile library and several special collections. Within the local authorities, the library is affiliated to the department of art and culture. The library provides the residents of Cologne (about a million inhabitants) with information resources for education and training; in addition, there are many users from the region around Cologne and from neighbouring countries (Belgium, Netherlands, Luxembourg).

The central library
It provides access to all sorts of printed items (also printed music and maps), CDs, CD-ROMs, DVDs (also interactive DVDs), Blu-rays, audio books, games, language courses, software and multi media packages. There are PCs on all floors, which can be used for searching the internet, the catalogue or databases. Furthermore, there are W-LAN-areas, photocopiers, CD listening stations, space for private study and meeting rooms for training sessions. On the third floor, a zone has been created which can be used by pupils for private study or group work. Patrons can practise playing the piano, as there is an e-piano and – in a separate room – a grand piano.
In the entrance area there is an information centre with national and international newspapers, exhibition catalogues and a window projection on cultural events (images on back-projected in-window display). A large reading room is a venue for events.

There are several special collections: the library for the blind (providing access to a great number of items by 'Medibus'), the Heinrich-Böll-Archiv (Heinrich Böll Archive) and the collection 'Literatur in Köln' (literature in Cologne). There is an exhibition space with the last work room (completely furnished) of Heinrich Böll and a photo exhibition of authors from Cologne.
In addition, the central library hosts the Germania Judaica, Cologne's library for the history of the German Jewry.

The branch libraries

There are 11 branch libraries, situated in different districts of Cologne. There are branches in Bocklemünd, Chorweiler, Ehrenfeld, Kalk, Mülheim, Neubrück, Nippes, Porz, Rodenkirchen and Sülz. The branch in the Südstadt (Haus Balchem) is something special: it is housed in a building, which was reconstructed in 17th century baroque style after the second world war.
The branch library in Bocklemünd is something like a junior company: it is managed by apprentices under the supervision of a young library employee. 
The mobile library serves another 18 neighbourhoods in Cologne.

Service
Among a range of other items, current bestsellers are provided (fiction, non-fiction, pop music, films). The library offers various library education programmes and cooperates with schools. The interlibrary loans department procures items from other libraries, if they are not available in Cologne. There are training sessions on how to conduct searches in databases and on the internet. The school service offers educational programmes designed for various age groups using methods to encourage pupils to be active, thus promoting media and information literacy.

Virtual library
The homepage of the public library of Cologne has been integrated in the site of the City of Cologne. The public library provides high-speed access to the internet and licensed databases that can be searched by customers. It was one of four pilot libraries for the introduction of the Onleihe, a download portal for the temporary use of digital items (e-books, electronic audiobooks and music CDs, e-videos, e-papers). The library communicates via Twitter, Blog and Facebook.

Events
Cologne Library is not just a knowledge store, but also a much-frequented location for events. Among the highlights is the series of events called 'wissenswert': presenters talk with authors who read from their books.
Throughout the library system, there are readings, exhibitions and a programme designed for children.

Reading promotion
Cologne library offers a reading promotion programme which consists of modules. The 'Cologne bookbabies' focuses on promoting language acquisition and perception. 'Papalapap' is mainly aimed at day nurseries, with playful reading promotion elements such as the Papalapap-paint book.
Older children can join the 'Leseclub'. Each member between six and 15 years of age receives an individual reading diary with age-specific tasks.
'Ran ans Lesen' was developed for the great number of all-day schools in Cologne. This project includes writing 'reading diaries', volunteer engagement and cooperation with teachers.

Intercultural meeting place
As a multicultural meeting place, the public library of Cologne opens up many opportunities for language acquisition and cooperates with agencies which run integration courses. The integration project Bi-IN is about making teachers of integration courses see the advantages of using a library and making the participants of the courses familiar with the library.

Cooperations
There is cooperative networking with '' (a literature festival), the 'Literaturhaus Köln' (House of Literature), the 'SK Stiftung Kultur' (the cultural foundation of the municipal savings bank of Cologne), the 'Belgisches Haus' (the 'Belgian House'), Cologne University and the 'Kölner Freiwilligen-Agentur' (a volunteer agency in Cologne), the 'Hochschulbibliothekszentrum' (a service centre for academic libraries) and the 'Volkshochschule Köln' (the municipal adult education centre). The library has also been involved in cooperation with many schools in Cologne, using the framework provided by the project 'Bildungspartner Bibliothek und Schule NRW' (Education Partners in Libraries and Schools /Northrhine-Westphalia).

Friends of the Library (The Friends Associations)
 Förderverein StadtBibliothek Köln e.V.(supporting the Minibib, the library in the park)

In addition, there are several 'Friends of the Library'-Associations who support a specific branch library in their neighbourhood:
 Lesezeichen e.V.
 Literamus e.V.
 Förderverein Haus Balchem
 Lesen in Nippes e.V.
 Lesen in Mülheim e.V.

History
The first so-called Volksbibliothek was opened in 1890. In the course of time, several Volksbibliotheken (people's libraries) and Lesehallen (reading halls) were established by donations and municipal funds.
In 1931, a mobile library was introduced in Cologne. After World War II numerous book donations from abroad helped to restock the Volksbüchereien, as they were called by then. In 1966 the city council decided to rename them; the name Stadtbücherei Köln was chosen.

The central library, opened in 1979, was modelled on the Anglo-American public library. 
In Cologne, there are two institutions having 'Stadtbibliothek' in their name: The 'Universitäts- und Stadtbibliothek Köln' (University and City Library of Cologne), being originally funded by the city of Cologne, adopted this name in 1920; the 'StadtBibliothek Köln' (the former Stadtbücherei Köln) is the public library, the upper-case 'B' making it easier to help tell them apart.

References

Notes

Sources
The website of Cologne Public Library contains much of the information used in this article.

Further References
 Fühles-Ubach, Simone; Greskowiak, Dirk; Vogt, Hannelore: Aktives Handeln in schwieriger Lage – Strategische Planung für die Stadtbibliothek Köln. In: B.I.T. online 2010, Band 13, Heft 4, S. 401–404.
 Nötzelmann, Cordula: German public libraries. In. IFLA Public library section ENews, p. 4.
 Interessenkreisaufstellung in Öffentlichen Bibliotheken: eine richtungsweisende Bestandspräsentation am Beispiel der StadtBibliothek Köln. Master's Thesis Fachhochschule Köln 2003. (with an abstract in English)

External links

 
 Cologne Public Library on the website of the Goethe-Institut: The library's makerspace and an interview with the head librarian Dr. Hannelore Vogt about the library's strategy

Public libraries in Cologne
Buildings and structures in Cologne
Education in Cologne
1890 establishments in Germany
Libraries established in 1890